Brora is a village in the east of Sutherland, in the Highland area of Scotland.

Origin of the name
The name Brora is derived from Old Norse and means "river with a bridge".

History
Brora is a small industrial village, having at one time a coal pit, boat building, salt pans, fish curing, lemonade factory, the new Clynelish Distillery (as well as the old Clynelish distillery which is now called the Brora distillery
), wool mill, bricks and a stone quarry. The white sandstone in the Clynelish quarry belongs to the Brora Formation, of the Callovian and Oxfordian stages (formerly Middle Oolite) of the Mid-Late Jurassic. Stone from the quarry was used in the construction of London Bridge, Liverpool Cathedral and Dunrobin Castle. When in operation, the coalmine was the most northerly coalmine in the UK. Brora was the first place in the north of Scotland to have electricity thanks to its wool industry. This distinction gave rise to the local nickname of "Electric City" at the time. Brora also houses a baronial style clock tower which is a war memorial.

Archaeology 
In 2005, members of the Clyne Heritage Society (CHS) monitored structures eroding from the dunes on the Back Beach, south of the harbour. This was a pilot project for the Shorewatch programme, which aimed to train community groups to search for new archaeological sites and record information on them to be passed on to local and national archives. CHS members found a map, dated 1812, which depicts ‘Old Salt Pans’ marked at the position of the eroding structures. They also found records showing that the ‘Old Salt Pans’ were constructed in 1598 but had gone out of use within a few years.

Transport
The village is situated where the A9 road and the Far North Line bridge the River Brora. The village is served by a railway station. Buses operate about every two hours Mondays-Saturdays and infrequently on Sundays from Brora to Golspie, Dornoch, Tain and Inverness in the south and Helmsdale, Dunbeath, Lybster, Wick, Castletown, Thurso and Scrabster in the north. These are on routes X98, and X99 and are operated by Stagecoach Highlands.

Education 
An education is available for primary school children in Brora Primary School in Johnstone Place. The building was formerly Brora High School, that included the primary department. Although the school opened in 1962, the secondary department closed in 1985. It includes a playgroup, nursery and Primaries 1 to 7. Older children are taken by school transportation to the nearby Golspie High School.

Sport
Brora Rangers F.C. were founded in 1879 and have been members of the Highland Football League since 1962. They moved to their present stadium, Dudgeon Park, in 1922. Amongst the local amenities are an 18-hole links golf course designed by James Braid in 1923 for sum of £23, bowling and tennis facilities.

Government listening station
To the south-east of the village is the former Brora Y Station which operated as a Government listening station between 1940 and 1986.

Notable people from Brora
Megan Boyd (1915–2001), fly-tier.
Rev Prof William John Cameron, twice Moderator of the General Assembly of the Free Church of Scotland
 Isabella Gordon Mackay was born near here in the 1770s. She created support for Presbyterians in Nova Scotia sending teachers, ministers and more.

References

External links

 Brora Visitor information site

 
Populated places in Sutherland
Villages in Highland (council area)
Mining communities in Scotland